Howard Sosin was born in Illinois, and for a time was an associate professor at the Columbia Business School. He spent his early career at Bell Labs and subsequently moved to Drexel Burnham Lambert. In 1987, claiming to have "a better model for valuing interest rate swaps," he and two colleagues left Drexel to found American International Group Financial Products, where they took advantage of a triple-A balance sheet to pioneer the creation of many long-dated over-the-counter derivative products. Sosin left AIG in 1993 after a falling out with Chairman Maurice "Hank" Greenberg.

References

External links
 Howard Sosin's Plan to Return Insolvent Banks to Financial Health - Big Think
 The World According to Lee Wakeman - on Howard Sosin and financial derivatives
 Cheating Wife Awarded More Than $40M - San Francisco Chronicle
 Wife Cheats on Husband, Gets $40M in Divorce - FOX News
 Settlements and Verdicts:Howard Sosin - Lawyers and Settlements
 Record $24m awarded in divorce - Connecticut Post
 The Beautiful Machine - The Washington Post

American financial businesspeople
Living people
People from Illinois
Year of birth missing (living people)